Huaraz Quechua is a dialect of Huaylas Quechua spoken in the city of Huaraz, Huaraz Province and neighbouring areas of Peru.

Numbers 
The numbers in Huarás Quechua are:

References 

Quechuan languages